This is a list of schools in the American Roman Catholic Archdiocese of New York. The archdiocese covers New York, Bronx, and Richmond Counties in New York City (coterminous with the boroughs of Manhattan, the Bronx, and Staten Island, respectively), as well as Dutchess, Orange, Putnam, Rockland, Sullivan, Ulster, and Westchester counties in New York state.

To see a list of schools that have closed in the archdiocese, please review the List of closed schools in the Roman Catholic Archdiocese of New York. The majority of the schools in the archdiocese are no longer fully staffed by religious orders and largely now consist of lay faculty, with some religious continuing to maintain a presence in the schools they once founded and/or staffed. Many schools may now be in the care of a board of trustees. In July 2020 the archdiocese announced the permanent closure of a number of schools due to the financial effects of the COVID-19 pandemic, This list may contain inaccuracies as to what schools are still in operation.

Seminaries
 St. Joseph's Seminary (Yonkers) – major seminary of the archdiocese established in 1896. Currently serves as the major seminary for the archdiocese, the Diocese of Brooklyn, the Diocese of Rockville Centre and the Community of the Franciscan Friars of the Renewal. Seminarians from other dioceses and religious orders also study at St. Joseph's for major seminary. The seminary also offers graduate degree programs for both lay and religious. Formerly staffed by the Society of St. Sulpice.

High schools

New York City

The Bronx
 Academy of Mount St. Ursula – All-girls' school established in 1855; staffed by the Ursuline Sisters. amsu.org
 All Hallows High School – All-boys' school established in 1909; staffed by the Irish Christian Brothers and Dominican Sisters of Amityville. allhallows.org
 Cardinal Hayes High School – All-boys' school established in 1941; staffed by archdiocesan priests, the Brothers of St. Charles Lwanga, the Carmelite Brothers, the Dominican Sisters of Sparkill and the Irish Christian Brothers. Formerly staffed by the De La Salle Christian Brothers, the Franciscan Fathers & Brothers, the Marist Brothers and the Xaverian Brothers. cardinalhayes.org 
 Cardinal Spellman High School – formerly co-institutional education school, now co-educational school established in 1959; staffed by archdiocesan priests, the Sisters of St. Francis and formerly staffed by the De La Salle Christian Brothers and the Sisters of Charity. cardinalspellman.org
 Fordham Preparatory School – All-boys' school established in 1841; staffed by the Jesuit Fathers. fordhamprep.org
 Monsignor Scanlan High School – Co-educational school established in 1976; staffed by the Dominican Sisters of Sparkill. Formerly staffed by the Marist Brothers. scanlanhs.edu  
 Mount Saint Michael Academy – All-boys' school established in 1926; staffed by the Marist Brothers. mtstmichael.org
 Preston High School – All-girls' school established in 1947; staffed by the Sisters of the Divine Compassion. prestonhs.org
 St. Barnabas High School – All-girls' school established in 1924; staffed by the Sisters of Charity and the Religious of Jesus and Mary. stbarnabashigh.com
 St. Catharine Academy – All-girls' school established in 1889; staffed by the Sisters of Mercy, the Dominican Sisters of Sparkill and the Sisters of Charity; formerly staffed by the Religious of the Sacred Heart of Mary. scahs.org
 St. Raymond Academy – All-girls' school established in 1960; staffed by the Sisters of Charity and the Dominican Sisters of Blauvelt. straymondacademy.org
 St. Raymond High School for Boys – All-boys' school established in 1960; staffed by the De La Salle Christian Brothers. straymondhighschool.org

Manhattan

 Cathedral High School – All-girls' school founded in 1905; staffed by the Sisters of Charity. cathedralhs.org
 Convent of the Sacred Heart – All-girls' school founded in 1881; sponsored by the Religious of the Sacred Heart of Jesus. cshnyc.org
 Cristo Rey New York High School – Co-educational school staffed by the Sisters of Christian Charity and the Jesuit Fathers; sponsored by the Society of the Holy Child Jesus and the Sisters of St. Dominic. cristoreyny.org
 Dominican Academy – All-girls' school staffed by the Dominican Sisters of Columbus and the Sisters, Servants of the Immaculate Heart of Mary. dominicanacademy.org 
 La Salle Academy – All-boys' school founded in 1848; staffed by the De La Salle Christian Brothers. lasalleacademy.org
 Loyola School – Co-educational school founded in 1900; staffed by the Jesuit Fathers and the Sisters of Notre Dame; formerly all-boys until 1973. loyola-nyc.org
 Marymount School – All-girls' school founded in 1926; staffed by the Religious of the Sacred Heart of Mary. marymount.k12.ny.us
 Notre Dame School – All-girls' school established in 1943; formerly located on West 79th Street and St. Mark's Place;  staffed by the Sisters of St. Ursula. cheznous.org
 Regis High School – All-boys' school founded in 1914; staffed by the Jesuit Fathers. regis.org
 St. George Academy – Ukrainian parish high school. saintgeorgeschools.org 

 St. Jean Baptiste High School – All-girls' school founded in 1929; staffed by the Congregation de Notre Dame. stjean.org
 St. Vincent Ferrer High School – All-girls' school staffed by the Dominican Sisters of Our Lady of the Springs; formerly staffed by the Dominican Sisters of Columbus. saintvincentferrer.com
 Xavier High School – All-boys' school staffed by the Jesuit Fathers. xavierhs.org

Staten Island
 Monsignor Farrell High School – All-boys' school established in 1960; staffed by archdiocesan priests, Irish Christian Brothers and the Sisters of Charity. msgrfarrellhs.org
 Moore Catholic High School – Co-educational school established in 1962; formerly an all-girls' school (1962–1969). Staffed by archdiocesan priests and the Sisters of Our Lady of the Garden (2002 – present); formerly staffed by the Sisters of the Presentation of the Blessed Virgin Mary. moorecatholichs.org
 Notre Dame Academy – All-girls' school established in 1903; staffed by the Congregation de Notre Dame. notredameacademy.org
 St. Joseph by the Sea High School – Co-educational school established in 1963; formerly an all-girls' school (1963–1973); staffed by archdiocesan priests, the Sisters of Charity, the Sisters of St. Francis and the Sisters, Servants of the Immaculate Heart of Mary. stjosephbythesea.org
 St. Joseph Hill Academy – All-girls' school established in 1930; staffed by the Daughters of Divine Charity. stjhill.org
 St. Peter's Boys High School – All-boys' school established in 1917; staffed by the De La Salle Christian Brothers and the Sisters of St. Joseph of Brentwood. stpetersboyshs.org

Dutchess County
 Our Lady of Lourdes High School (Poughkeepsie) – Co-educational school established in 1958; staffed by the Marist Brothers; sponsored by the Dominican Sisters. ollchs.org

Orange County
 John S. Burke Catholic High School (Goshen) – Co-educational school established in 1963; formerly staffed by the Sisters of the Presentation of the Blessed Virgin Mary. burkecatholic.org

Rockland County
 Albertus Magnus High School (Bardonia) – Co-educational school established in 1957; staffed by the Dominican Sisters of Sparkill. albertusmagnus.net

Westchester County
 Archbishop Stepinac High School - All-boys' school established in 1948; operated by the archdiocese until becoming independent in 2010; staffed by archdiocesan priests stepinac.org
 Iona Preparatory School (New Rochelle) – All-boys' school established in 1916; operated and staffed by the Irish Christian Brothers. ionaprep.org
 John F. Kennedy Catholic High School (Somers) – Co-educational school established in 1967; operated by the archdiocese and staffed by archdiocesan priests and the Sisters of the Divine Compassion. kennedycatholic.org 
 Maria Regina High School (Hartsdale) – All-girls' school established in 1957; formerly operated by the archdiocese, now operated by a board of trustees; staffed by lay faculty- formerly staffed by the Sisters of the Resurrection.
 Sacred Heart High School (Yonkers) – Co-educational school established in 1923; operated by the parish of Sacred Heart and the Capuchin Friars; formerly staffed by the Capuchin Friars, the  Sisters of St. Agnes and the De La Salle Christian Brothers. sacredhearths.net
 Salesian High School (New Rochelle) – All-boys' school established in 1920; operated and staffed by the Salesians of Don Bosco. salesianhigh.org
 School of the Holy Child (Rye) – All-girls' school established in 1957; operated and staffed by the Society of the Holy Child Jesus. holychildrye.org
 The Montfort Academy (Mount Vernon) – Co-educational school established in 2001 in Katonah and relocated to Mt. Vernon in 2014; operated and staffed by lay faculty.  themontfortacademy.org
 The Ursuline School (New Rochelle) – All-girls' school established in 1897; founded by the Ursuline Sisters. ursuline.pvt.k12.ny.us

Elementary schools

New York City

The Bronx
 Christ the King Parish Elementary School (1345 Grand Concourse)
 Holy Cross Parish School (1846 Randall Avenue) – Established in 1923.
 Holy Family Parish School (2169 Blackrock Avenue)
  Holy Rosary School (1500 Arnow Avenue) holyrosaryschoolbronx.org 
 Immaculate Conception Parish School (378 East 151st Street) – Established in 1854; formerly staffed by the De La Salle Christian Brothers. ics151.org
 Immaculate Conception Parish School (760 East Gun Hill Road) – Established in 1950; formerly staffed by the Pallottine Sisters. schoolofimmaculateconception.org 
 Mount St. Michael Private Elementary School – All-boys' school; grades 6–8 only.
 Our Lady of Grace Parish School (3981 Bronxwood Avenue)
 Our Lady of Mount Carmel Parish School (2465 Bathgate Avenue) – Established in 1924; formerly staffed by the Pallottine Sisters, the Sisters of Our Lady of Lourdes and the Brothers of the Holy Cross.
 Our Lady of Refuge Parish School (2708 Briggs Avenue)
 Sacred Heart Parish School (95 West 168th Street) – Established in 1926; formerly staffed by the Sisters of Mercy and the Brothers of the Christian Schools. shhighbridge.org 
 Santa Maria School (1510 Zerega Avenue) – Established in 1951; staffed by the Apostles of the Sacred Heart of Jesus. santamariabronx.org
 St. Angela Merici Parish School (266 East 163rd Street) – Established in 1908; staffed by the Oblates of the Blessed Trinity; formerly staffed by the Ursuline Sisters. saintangelamerici.com 
 St. Anselm Parochial School (685 Tinton Avenue) – Established in 1908; formerly staffed by the Dominican Sisters of Blauvelt. stanselmbx.org
 St. Athanasius Parish School (830 Southern Boulevard) – Established in 1913; formerly staffed by the Sisters of Charity and the Lasallian Christian Brothers. stathanasiusbronx.org 
 St. Barnabas Parish School (413 East 241st Street) – Established in 1913; staffed by the Sisters of Charity. stbarnabasschool.org 
 St. Brendan Parish School (268 East 207th Street) – Established in 1912; staffed by the Dominican Sisters of Sparkill.
 St. Clare of Assisi School (1911 Hone Avenue) – Established in 1951; staffed by the Oblates of the Blessed Trinity. stclareofassisischool.org 
 St. Frances de Chantal School (2962 Harding Ave.) – Established in 1930; staffed by the Sisters of the Divine Compassion. sfdchantalschool.org
 St. Francis of Assisi School (4300 Baychester Avenue) – Established in 1968; grades 1–8 only. sfabx.com 
 St. Francis Xavier School (1711 Haight Avenue) –  Established in 1930; formerly staffed by the Sisters of Mercy. sfxschool.net
 St. Gabriel School (590 West 235th Street) – Established in 1941. saintgabrielschoolbronx.org 
 St. Helena School (2050 Benedict Avenue) – sthelenaelementary.org 
 St. Ignatius School (740 Manida Street) – Established in 1995; staffed and administered by the Jesuits; boys-only from 1995 to 2004; grades 6–8 only. sis-nativity.org
 St. John Chrysostom School (1144 Hoe Avenue) – sjchrysostom.org
 St. Joseph Parish School (1946 Bathgate Avenue) – Established in 1877; closed in 2019. saintjosephschoolbronx.org
 St. Lucy Parish School (Mace Avenue at Bronxwood Avenue) – Established in 1955; staffed until 1974 by the Franciscan Sisters of Allegheny. stlucys.org 
 St. Margaret of Cortona Parish School (452 West 160th Street) – Established in 1926; formerly staffed by the Sisters of Charity. stmargaretschoolriverdale.com
 St. Margaret Mary School (121 East 177th Street)
 St. Mary Parish School (3956 Carpenter Avenue)
 St. Nicholas of Tolentine Parish School (2345 University Avenue) – Established in 1907.
 St. Philip Neri Parish School (3031 Grand Concourse)
 St. Raymond Parish School (2380 East Tremont Avenue) – Staffed by the Religious of Jesus and Mary. straymondelementary.org
 St. Simon Stock Parish School (2195 Valentine Avenue) – Established in 1928.  stsimonstockschool.org 
 St. Theresa School (2872 St. Theresa Avenue) – Established in 1954; formerly staffed by the Dominican Sisters of Sparkill. sites.google.com/sttheresaschoolbronx.org/st-theresa-school-bronx
 Sts. Peter and Paul Parish School (838 Brook Avenue) –  ssppschoolsite.org 
 The School of St. Benedict (1016 Edison Avenue) – stbenedictschoolbx.org
  Villa Maria Academy (3355 Country Club Road) – Staffed by the Congregation of Notre Dame Sisters. vma-ny.org
 Visitation of the Blessed Virgin Mary Parish School (171 West 239th Street) – visitationschoolbronx.org

Manhattan
 Academy of St. Joseph (111 Washington Place) – K–8; established in 2007. academyofsaintjoseph.org
 Annunciation School (461 West  131st Street) – K–8; formerly staffed by the De La Salle Christian Brothers and the Dominican Sisters.
 Ascension Parish School (220 West  108th Street) – Established in 1911; formerly staffed by the Sisters of Charity and the De La Salle Christian Brothers. ascensionschoolnyc.org
 Blessed Sacrament Parish School (147 West 70th Street) – Established in 1903; formerly staffed by the Sisters of Charity and the Lasallian Christian Brothers. sblsnyc.org
 Convent of the Sacred Heart (1 East 91st Street) – All-girls' school; formerly staffed by the Religious of the Sacred Heart of Jesus. cshnyc.org
 Cornelia Connelly Center (220 East 4th Street) – Grades 5–8 only. connellycenter.org 
 The Epiphany School (234 East 22nd Street) – Established in 1888; formerly staffed by the Lasallian Christian Brothers (1900–1935) and the Sisters of Charity (1888–1978). theepiphanyschool.org
 Good Shepherd School (620 Isham Street) – Formerly staffed by the Sisters of Mercy and the De La Salle Christian Brothers. gsschoolnyc.org
 Guardian Angel Parish School (193 Tenth Avenue) –  guardianangelschool-nyc.org
  Immaculate Conception Parish School (419 East 13th Street) – immaculateconceptionschoolnyc.org 
 Incarnation Parish School (570 West 175th Street) – Formerly staffed by the De La Salle Christian Brothers. incarnationnyc.org 
  Marymount Private School (1026 Fifth Avenue) – Established in 1926; formerly staffed by the Religious of the Sacred Heart of Mary. marymountnyc.org
 Mount Carmel/Holy Rosary Parish School (371 Pleasant Avenue) – Established in 1949. mtcarmelholyrosary.org
 Nativity Mission Private School (204 Forsyth Street) – Established in 1971; all-boys' school; grades 6–8 only; staffed and administered by the Jesuits. nativitymissionschool.org
 Our Lady of Lourdes Parish School (438 West 143rd Street) – Established in 1904. ourladyoflourdesschool.net   
 Our Queen of Angels Parish School (232 East 113th Street) olqaeastharlem.org 
 Our Lady Queen of Martyrs Parish School (Arden Street at Dongan Place) – Established in 1932. olqmnyc.org 
 Sacred Heart of Jesus Parish School (456 West 52nd Street) – Established in 1892; previously staffed by the Sisters of Charity of New York and the Christian Brothers. shjsnyc.org
 St. Aloysius Jesuit School (West 132nd Street) – Established in 1940; previously staffed by the Handmaids of the Most Pure Heart of Mary; the school was transferred from the parish to the Jesuits in 2010. staloysiusschool.org
  St. Ann, The Personal School (314 East 110th Street) –  stannschoolnyc.org
 St. Brigid's Catholic School (185 East 7th Street) – Established in 1856; previously staffed by the Sisters of Charity of New York and the Christian Brothers; closed in 2019.
 St. Charles Borromeo Parish School (214 West 142nd Street) – Established in 1924; staffed by the Sisters of the Blessed Sacrament. stcharlesschoolcentral.org
 St. Elizabeth Parish School (612 West 187th Street) – steliznyc.org
 St. George Private School (215 East 6th Street) – saintgeorgeschools.org
 St. Gregory the Great Parish School (138 West 90th Street) – Established in 1913; formerly staffed by the Sisters of Charity of New York. stgregorymanhattan.org
 St. Ignatius Loyola Parish School (48 East 84th Street) – saintignatiusloyolaschool.com
 St. Joseph Parish School (420 East 87th Street) – sjsyorkville.org 
 St. Mark the Evangelist Parish School (55 West 138th Street) – saintmarkschool.org
 St. Paul Parish School (114 East 118th Street) – Established in 1877; staffed by the Sisters Servants of the Lord and Virgin of Matará; formerly staffed by the Sisters of Charity. stpaulschool.us
 St. Rose of Lima Parish School (517 West 164th Street) –Closed in 2019. stroseoflimanyc.org
 St. Stephen of Hungary Parish School (408 East 82nd Street) – Formerly staffed by the Sisters, Servants of the Immaculate Heart of Mary. saintstephenschool.org
 Transfiguration Parish School (29 Mott Street) – Formerly staffed by the Maryknoll Sisters. transfigurationschoolnyc.org

Staten Island
 Academy of St. Dorothy Private School – Established in 1932 by the Sisters of St. Dorothy.   
 Blessed Sacrament Parish School (830 Delafield Avenue) – Established in 1910; formerly staffed by the Sisters of Charity.
 Holy Rosary Parish School
 Immaculate Conception Parish School (Stapleton) – Established in 1907; formerly staffed by the Sisters of Charity. ics-si.org
 Notre Dame Academy Private School – All-girls' school.
 Our Lady Help of Christians Parish School – Closed in June 2019.
 Our Lady of Good Counsel Parish School
 Our Lady Queen of Peace Parish School
 Our Lady Star of the Sea Parish School
 Sacred Heart Parish School
 St. Adalbert Parish School
 St. Ann Parish School
 St. Charles Parish School – Established in 1963.
 St. Christopher Parish School
 St. Clare Parish School – Established in 1936; formerly staffed by the Presentation Sisters.
 St. John Villa Academy Private School (57 Cleveland Place) – Staffed by the Sisters of St. John the Baptist.
 St. Joseph Hill Academy Private School 
 St. Joseph Parish School
 St. Patrick Parish School
 St. Rita Parish School
 St. Teresa Parish School

Dutchess County
 Holy Trinity Elementary School (Poughkeepsie) – Established in 1952; staffed by the Sisters, Servants of the Immaculate Heart of Mary (since 1952); formerly staffed by the Marist Brothers (1957–1963). holy-trinity-school.com
 St. Denis/St. Columba Parish School (Hopewell Junction) – Grades 1–8 only; staffed by the Sisters of the Resurrection (since 2010);  formerly staffed by the Dominican Sisters.
 St. Martin de Porres Parish School (Poughkeepsie) – Established in 1853; formerly known as St. Michael School (1853–1962); formerly staffed by the Sisters of Christian Charity. stmartindeporresschool.org
 St. Mary Parish School (Fishkill) – stmaryfishkill.org

Orange County
 Bishop Dunn Memorial Private School (Newburgh) – Staffed by the Dominican Sisters of Hope. msmc.edu/bishop-dunn-memorial-school
 Most Precious Blood Parish School (Walden) – Established in 1966; staffed by the Dominican Sisters of Sparkill. mpbwalden.org
 Our Lady of Mount Carmel Parish School (Middletown) – mtcarmelschoolmiddletown.org
 Sacred Heart Parish School (Monroe) – Established in 1965; formerly staffed by the Dominican Sisters of Sparkill. sacredheartmonroe.net
 Sacred Heart Parish School (Newburgh) – sacredheartschoolnewburgh.org
 St. John the Evangelist Parish School (Goshen) – Grades 1–8 only; staffed by the Dominican Sisters of Blauvelt. sjsgoshen.org
 St. Stephen Parish School (Warwick) – Formerly staffed by the School Sisters of Notre Dame. ststephen-stedward.org

Putnam County
 St. James the Apostle Parish School (Carmel) – stjamescarmel.org

Rockland County
 Sacred Heart Parish School (Suffern) – sacredheartschoolsuffern.com
 St. Anthony Parish School (Nanuet) – Established in 1953; staffed by the Dominican Sisters of Sparkill. stanthonyschoolnanuet.org
 St. Gregory Barbarigo Parish School (Garnerville) – Established in 1963. sgbschool.org
 St. Margaret Parish School (Pearl River) – Established in 1953; formerly staffed by the Sisters of St. Dominic. saintmargaretschool.com
 St. Paul Parish School (Valley Cottage) – Established in 1961; staffed by the Sisters of St. Dominic. saintpaulschoolvc.com

Sullivan County
 St. Peter Regional Parish School (Liberty) – Established in 1897; formerly staffed by the Dominican Sisters of Blauvelt; closed in 2019. stpetersliberty.org

Ulster County
 Kingston Catholic School (Kingston) – Established in 1970; formed by the merger of St. Mary and St. Peter schools in Kingston. kingstoncatholicschool.com
 St. Joseph Parish School (Kingston) – Established in 1868; formerly staffed by the Sisters of Charity (1905–1943) and the Sisters of St. Ursula (1943–2001). stjokgn.org/revised2-school/SJSchool.html

Westchester County
 Annunciation Parish School (Crestwood) – Staffed by the Sisters of the Presentation of the Blessed Virgin Mary and lay faculty; formerly staffed by the Dominican Sisters of Newburgh. school.annunciationcrestwood.com
 Corpus Christi/Holy Family School (Port Chester) – Established in 2008 through the merger of Corpus Christi and Holy Family schools.
 Immaculate Conception Parish School (Tuckahoe) – Formerly staffed by the Sisters of St. Francis. icschoolonline.org
 Immaculate Heart of Mary Parish School (Scarsdale) – Established in 1928; formerly staffed by the Sisters of Charity (1928–1967) and the Dominican Sisters of Sparkill (1967–1972). ihmscarsdale.org
 Iona Preparatory Lower School (formerly Iona Grammar School) (New Rochelle) – All-boys' pre-k–8 school, staffed by the Irish Christian Brothers and lay faculty; merged with Iona Preparatory School in 2013; operated by Iona Preparatory School. ionagrammar.com
 Neumann Classical School (Tuckahoe) – neumannschool.org
 Our Lady of Mount Carmel Parish School (Elmsford) – Established in 1929; staffed by the Sisters of the Divine Compassion. olmc.ws 
 Our Lady of Perpetual Help Parish School (Pelham Manor) – olphpelham.com
 Our Lady of Sorrows Parish School (White Plains) – Grades 1–8 only.
 Our Lady of Victory Parish School (Mount Vernon) – Formerly staffed by the Sisters of St. Dominic.
 Resurrection Parish School (Rye) – Established in 1905; formerly staffed by the Sisters of Charity. resurrectionschool.com
 Sacred Heart Parish School (Hartsdale) – Established in 1953; staffed by the Sisters of Charity (since 1979); formerly staffed by the Sisters of the Divine Compassion (1953–1979).
 Sacred Heart Parish School (Yonkers) – shgsyonkers.org
 St. Ann Parish School (Yonkers) – Established in 1959; formerly staffed by the Sisters of Charity. stannschoolyonkers.org
 St. Anthony Parish School (Yonkers) – Established in 1962; staffed by the Dominican Sisters of Sparkill. stanthonyschoolyonkers.org 
 St. Augustine Parish School (Ossining) – Established in 1892; formerly staffed by the Sisters of Charity. staugustineschool.org
 St. Columbanus Parish School (Cortlandt Manor) – st-columbanus.com
 St. Eugene Parish School (Yonkers) – Established in 1951; previously staffed by the Sisters of St. Francis of Hastings-on-Hudson.
 St. John the Baptist Parish School (Yonkers) – Established in 1953; previously staffed by the Franciscan Sisters of Baltimore.
 St. Joseph Parish School (Bronxville)- Established in 1951; formerly staffed by the Adrian Dominican Sisters. stjosephschool. net
 St. Patrick Parish School (Yorktown Heights) – Established in 1953; formerly staffed by the Franciscan Sisters of Peace (1953–2004). stpatricksschoolyorktown.org
 St. Peter Parish School (Yonkers) – Established in 1911. stpetersny.com
 Sts. John & Paul Parish School (Larchmont) – sjpschool.org
 Transfiguration Parish School (Tarrytown) – transfigurationschool.org

Special schools
 St. Joseph's Private School for the Deaf (The Bronx) – Established in 1869; sponsored by the Daughters of the Heart of Mary. sjsdny.org

Former schools

See also
 List of Catholic schools in New York (state)
 Lavelle School for the Blind (The Bronx) – Established in 1904; sponsored by the Marist Brothers and Dominican Sisters of Blauvelt. Formerly known as the Catholic Institution for the Blind.

References

New York, Roman Catholic Archdiocese of New York
Schools
 
 
Roman Catholic
Roman Catholic
Roman Catholic
New York City
Schools in the Roman Catholic Archdiocese of New York